Topaloğlu is a Turkish surname, meaning son (-oğlu) of Topal. Notable people with the surname include:

Ali Topaloğlu (born 1998), Turkish track and field athlete
Caner Topaloğlu (born 1985), Turkish basketball player 
Perihan Topaloğlu (born 1987), Turkish female handball player
Yeliz Topaloğlu (born 1978), Turkish female football referee
Cihan Topaloğlu (born 1992), Turkish footballer

Turkish-language surnames